HMS Cyclops was the lead ship of the  breastwork monitors built for the Royal Navy during the 1870s. The ships were ordered to satisfy demands for local defence during the war scare of 1870, but the pace of construction slowed tremendously as the perceived threat of war declined. The ship spent most of her career in reserve; her only sustained period in commission was four months in Portland Harbour, during the Russo-Turkish War in 1878 when the British were trying to force the Russians to end the war without allowing them to seize Constantinople. Cyclops was sold for scrap in 1903.

Design and description 

The Cyclops-class ships were modified versions of the Cerberus class. They displaced . Their crew consisted of 156 officers and men. The ships had two 4-cylinder inverted compound steam engines, each driving a single propeller shaft.

The ships mounted four 10-inch rifled muzzle-loading guns in twin-gun turrets fore and aft of the superstructure. The guns could fire both solid shot and explosive shells. They were mounted on carriages that used hydraulic jacks to elevate and depress the guns.

The gun turrets had 10 inches on their faces and 9 inches on the sides and rear.

Construction
HMS Cyclops was laid down on 10 September 1870 by the Thames Ironworks in London. She was launched on 18 July 1871 and commissioned in January 1872. The ship was towed to Devenport that same month for what proved to be a very lengthy fitting out period that was not completed until 4 May 1877. Cyclops cost £156,782 to build.

Refit
Although a recommendation had been made while the ships were still under construction to extend the superstructure out to the sides of the ship to improve their stability and habitability, this was not acted upon until they were refitted during the 1880s. This refit also strengthened the breastwork and upper decks, added another watertight bulkhead as well as a false keel. Four quick-firing 3-pounder Hotchkiss guns were added on the breastwork for torpedo boat defence as well as five machine guns and several searchlights. This increased their crew to approximately 191 men and added  to their displacement.

Service
HMS Cyclops was the third ship to be completed, although she was the lead ship of the class. She was placed in 1st Class Reserve after her completion. The ship, along with her sisters, was commissioned between April and August 1878 during the Russo-Turkish War for service with Admiral Sir Cooper Key's Particular Service Squadron in Portland Harbour. Cyclops was paid off at Chatham in August 1878 and refitted in 1887–89. All four ships of the class participated in the annual fleet manoeuvers in 1887, 1889–90 and 1892; in between times they were in Fleet Reserve. HMS Cyclops, like all of her sisters, was placed on the non-effective list in January 1902, transferred to the E Division of the Dockyard Reserve at Sheerness in May 1902, and sold on 7 July 1903 for £8,400.

Notes

Footnotes

References
 

 

Cyclops-class monitors
Monitors of the United Kingdom
1871 ships